Northeast High School is a high school located at 1601 Cottman Avenue (at Algon Avenue) in Philadelphia, Pennsylvania.

Northeast is one of the oldest high schools in Philadelphia, founded in 1890 as the Northeast Manual Training School. Before 1957, it was located at 8th Street and Lehigh Avenue in Philadelphia (later the home of Thomas Edison High School). As of June 2016, Northeast High School had 175 graduating classes. 

Northeast serves Rhawnhurst and other sections of Northeast Philadelphia. The high school was featured in the A&E series Teach: Tony Danza, where actor Tony Danza taught a tenth grade English class during the 2009–2010 school year. It was also the setting for Frederick Wiseman's 1968 documentary on high schools titled, simply, High School.

In 2015, Northeast High School was recognized by U.S. News & World Report Best High Schools and won a bronze medal in recognition of its well rounded students, high standardized test scores, and great overall performance in Advanced Placement, International Baccalaureate, honors, and advanced classes.

Demographics
Northeast High School students comes from very diverse racial, economic, and cultural backgrounds. According to the school profile generated by the School District of Philadelphia the racial makeup of the school based on the 2015–2016 school year is 30.3% African American, 18.5% White, 21.2% Asian, 23.2% Latino, and 6.8% other races. 19.7% of the school students are English Language Learners. 11.2% with disabilities and 3.5% of the students are mentally gifted. 91.3% are economically disadvantaged (students of a household that meets the income eligibility guidelines for free or reduced-price meals), as evaluated by the Community Eligibility Provision (CEP) for the National School Lunch Program and School Breakfast Program SBP).

Northeast High School has 3,600 students, making it the most populated high school in the city of Philadelphia. When including the teachers and staff, the school contains more than 3,700 people. Some classes struggle to maintain a maximum of 33 students, as the Philadelphia Federation of Teachers (PFT) contract requires.

 the student body speaks about 60 languages; about half of the students were English as a second language learners at some point, and about 20% are enrolled in the school's English for Speakers of Other Languages (ESOL) program.

Uniform policy
Northeast High School's uniform policy was put into place in November 2009: white oxford button shirts with khaki pants.
When students become seniors at the school, they are given uniquely designed senior ties & scarves to be worn along with their uniforms. Wearing either a senior tie or senior scarf distinguishes the senior class from the rest of the general student population.

Transportation access

Many students who live out of the immediate area get to school by one of these bus routes from across the city. For those students who live in areas further than a mile away from the school SEPTA provides them with free weekly bus TransPasses.

Teams
Northeast High School has many sports teams, all of which are known as The Vikings.

The girls' field hockey team has won the Public League Championship the last four out of five years, last being in 2011.

The wrestling team went undefeated and won the school's first championship in wrestling beating Thomas Edison High School 45 to 26 on January 29, 2009. The school won their second championship in wrestling on February 1, 2012, beating Central High School 33 to 28.

In 2012, the boys' soccer team won the AAA public league championship after beating Franklin Towne Charter High School 1–0 on October 30, 2012. This gives the team their first championship since 2007. Three year starting sweeper and 1st team all public Matt Feinstein Sr kept up his solid defense all year to finally deliver a public league championship after losing in major upsets in both the 2010 and 2011 public league championship game.

The boys' lacrosse team has won the AAA public league championship back to back years in 2011 and 2012, both times beating George Washington High School giving them their only two championships.

The football team won the AAAA Public League Championship after beating George Washington High School 13–6 on November 13, 2010. This is the first championship for the football team since 1983.

Cheerleading
Northeast has won 1st place in their division of the PIAA District 12 Cheerleading/Spirit Competitions in 2014 and 2016, 2017 and 2018. They are the only team in Philadelphia to be invited to the State Competition the last 6 years that Philadelphia has been eligible.

Northeast High School also offers Boys' and Girls' JV and Varsity Tennis, Soccer, Table Tennis, Badminton, Swim, and many other recreational sports.

Rivalries
Northeast High School and Central High School have the longest running sports rivalry between public high schools in the country, dating back to 1892. Every Thanksgiving the two schools football teams square off against one another. As of 2011, the record of wins and losses for Northeast High School is 55–51.

Programs
Northeast High School has many different programs known as Small Learning Communities (SLCs), each of which has a specific career focus. Citywide admissions SLCs include: The Aerospace, Medical and Engineering Magnet Program, the IB Diploma Programme, AVID (Applied Visual and Interactive Design) CTE Program, and Sports Marketing and Management CTE Program. In addition there is an Arts & Education Program, Healthcare and Medical Program and a 9th Grade Academy.

Northeast also boasts an award-winning student newspaper, The Megaphone.

The Northeast High School Instrumental Music is one of the most diverse and sought after music programs in the City of Philadelphia. The Program includes a Marching Band, Jazz Ensemble, Symphony Orchestra, Symphonic Band, and a String Ensemble. In May 2009 the Northeast High School Instrumental program competed and won first place in Orchestra, String Ensemble, and second place Concert Band at Hershey Park, Pennsylvania.

Project Space Research Center (SPARC)
Northeast High's SPARC program originated in 1962 by Mr. Robert A. G. Montgomery, Jr. Northeast High students united designed and built a three-man space capsule mock-up to test the student astronauts ability to handle the space environment. With the help of a grant from the Southeastern Pennsylvania Heart Association, the program purchased electronic equipment and began to study in flight control instrumentation. Project SPARC was so highly recognized for its work that, during the summer of 1963, NASA invited 18 SPARC students to tour the Marshall Space Flight Center, Manned Spacecraft Center, Cape Canaveral, and the Goddard Space Flight Center.

By the end of 1963, the students had designed a simulated capsule and control area, and construction began on a wing of the stage at the school. The Home and School Association and the Alumni Association made many contributions to aid SPARC. In early May 1964, the first capsule test took place. The chamber was constructed as a closed oxygen-replenishment system.

The SPARC Project was updated to pursue the goals of President George W. Bush's Vision for Space Exploration. Project SPARC was realigned to simulate the NASA Constellation program and its mission to return to the moon. In 2009 Project SPARC flew its first Constellation mission, sending six students to the moon and establishing a two-module lunar habitat. SPARC facilities include a 21' Shuttle Orbiter mockup built by the students, the actual Apollo training capsule from NASA, an eight station mission control center, a movie and animation learning center and electronics and robotics laboratories. Students can utilize a new facility which incorporates computer and electronic action scripts, video presentations and simulations. Like the SPARC project in the 1960s, they are able to simulate the experience of operating a spaceborne mission. SPARC has attempted several simulations in a few different simulators to the moon, orbits around the earth, and to Mars.

In December 2013 the Philadelphia School District, facing difficult budget challenges, cut off funding for all after-school programs including Project SPARC.  At the time it appeared the nation's first high school space program would come to end after more than 50 years.  Word soon spread about SPARC's cancelation and the alumni responded to help save the program.  A GoFundMe site was started and social media was used to engage SPARC alumni and friends.  $13,000 was raised within the first month and almost $20,000 altogether. These funds enabled the SPARC students to carry out a May 2014 project to establish a permanent habitat on the moon.  The funding also helped provide some long needed upgrades to SPARC's infrastructure.

This quick response was followed by the formation of the Northeast High School Project SPARC Boosters (http://www.nehssparcboosters.org/) to help ensure SPARC's long-term financial sustainability.  SPARC students have embraced their legacy and continue to build on SPARC's history.  Two additional missions were conducted during the 2014–15 academic year with a return trip to the moon in December 2014 and a mission to Mars in April 2015. Project SPARC membership includes more than 130 students classified as full-time members. These students have regular responsibilities in the areas of their specialties and they conduct all of the research and operational activities.

Project SPARC's honorary Flight Director is Philadelphia astronaut Chris Ferguson, who has visited the facility and held video teleconferences with the SPARC students from the Houston pace Center.

Notable alumni
 Herb Adderley, Hall of Fame pro football player
 Walter Bahr, soccer player
 Butch Ballard, jazz drummer
 Michael Bratman, philosopher and professor at Stanford University
 Leonard Burman, American Economist and professor at Maxwell School of Citizenship and Public Affairs
 Ann Carr, U.S. Hall of Fame gymnast,
 Darrell L. Clarke
 David Cohen (politician)
 Angelo Coia, football player
 Amy Eilberg, Rabbi and first female graduate of the Jewish Theological Seminary of America
 Howard Eskin, radio and television personality
 David Gabai, Hughes-Rogers Professor of Mathematics at Princeton University
 Maje McDonnell, coach, scout, and ambassador for Philadelphia Phillies
 Kenneth Frazier, chairman of the board and chief executive officer of Merck & Co., Inc.
 William Goldenberg, film editor, won Academy Award for "Argo."
 Brent Grimes, football player
 Drew Gulak, professional wrestler
 Sonny Hill, organizer of Philadelphia summer basketball leagues
 Jesse Levis, baseball player scout
 Brett Mandel, author
 David Mirkin, director, writer, producer
 Len Oliver (soccer), soccer player
 Diane Renay, pop singer
 Guy Rodgers, Hall of Fame basketball player
Frank A. Salvatore, Pennsylvania State Representative for the 170th district from 1975 to 1984; Pennsylvania State Senator for the 5th district from 1985 to 2000
 Steven Smith (basketball), basketball player
 Eddie Stanky, baseball player and manager
 Lil Uzi Vert, Hip-Hop Artist
 Brendon Walsh, comedian
 Charles Way, football player
 Briana Williams, athletics

References

4. "Programs." Programs |. N.p., 9 Sept. 2011. Web. 16 July 2012. <https://web.archive.org/web/20120718211311/http://www.nehs.phila.k12.pa.us/nehs-wp/?page_id=8>.
5."Home." Northeast High School. Northeast High School, 14 June 2012. Web. 16 July 2012. <https://web.archive.org/web/20120718211117/http://www.nehs.phila.k12.pa.us/nehs-wp/>.
6. "School Profile." Northeast High School. SDP, 2011. Web. 16 July 2012. <https://web.archive.org/web/20120610143022/https://webapps.philasd.org/school_profile/view/8020>.

External links

 
  (1999-2007)
 Northeast High School: Class of 1969
 Northeast High School: Class of 1970
 Northeast High School: Project SPARC
 "High School" (documentary movie by Frederick Wiseman, filmed at Northeast High in 1968)

High schools in Philadelphia
School District of Philadelphia
Educational institutions established in 1890
Public high schools in Pennsylvania
Magnet schools in Pennsylvania
1890 establishments in Pennsylvania
Northeast Philadelphia